George Alfred Lawrence David (born April 7, 1942) is the former Chairman and Chief Executive Officer of United Technologies Corporation. David was elected UTC’s President in 1992 and Chief Executive Officer in 1994. He joined UTC’s Otis Elevator subsidiary in 1975 and became its President in 1986.

Life and career
David was born in Pennsylvania. His mother's name was Margaret; his father, Charles Wendell, was the director of libraries at the University of Pennsylvania and one of America's first Rhodes scholars. David left home after he graduated from high school in 1962 and enrolled in Harvard University on a full scholarship. He received his B.A. from Harvard and M.B.A. from the University of Virginia's Darden Graduate School of Business Administration. He worked for the Boston Consulting Group.

He is a board member of Citigroup, a member of The Business Council and the Business Roundtable, and Vice Chairman of the Peterson Institute for International Economics. He has served on the boards of the Graduate Business School at the University of Virginia, the National Minority Supplier Development Council, the U.S.-ASEAN Business Council, the Transatlantic Business Dialogue and the  Wadsworth Atheneum Museum of Art.

In 1975 David began working for Otis Elevator Co., which was taken over by United Technologies Corp that same year.

In 1999, the Russian Federation awarded David with the Order of Friendship for his contributions to that nation’s economy, particularly to its aerospace industry. In 2001, he received the Air Force Association's John R. Alison Award for contributions to national defense by an industrial leader. In 2002, France named him to its Legion of Honor.

In 2000, he was named as one of America's Most Powerful People by Forbes magazine; and CEO of the Year by Industry Week in 2003.

He was awarded "CEO of the Year 2005" by Chief Executive Magazine.

In 2007, his last full year as chief executive of United Technologies Corp., David reaped $65 million in total compensation.

He married his high school sweetheart, adopted three children with her and divorced her thirty later.

In 2009, David divorced his second wife Marie Douglas-David. She contested a $43 million postnuptial agreement and requested a settlement of approximately $100 million. Marie Douglas-David ended up with only $5 million.

In July 2012, David married Wendy Touton.

A member of the New York Yacht Club and the Royal Yacht Squadron, he is an avid yachtsman and racer actively campaigning his R/P 90 named Rambler (formerly Alfa Romeo I, ex-Shockwave) in regattas around the world. He then owned the Rambler 100. The yacht capsized during the 2011 Fastnet race. All crew, including David and Wendy Touton, were rescued.

In 2012 George David's maxi Rambler shattered the Newport to Bermuda Race record, shaving 14 hours off the previous fastest time recorded in the 635 mile race.

References

1942 births
American technology chief executives
Citigroup people
Harvard University alumni
Living people
Businesspeople from Wisconsin
United Technologies people
University of Virginia Darden School of Business alumni
Directors of BP
American corporate directors
American chairpersons of corporations
Episcopal Academy alumni